Gilead Township is one of the sixteen townships of Morrow County, Ohio, United States.  The 2010 census found 6,112 people lived in the township; 3,660 lived in the village of Mount Gilead and 437 lived in the village of Edison.

Geography
Located in the central part of the county, it borders the following townships:
Washington Township - north
Congress Township - northeast
Franklin Township - east
Harmony Township - southeast
Lincoln Township - south
Cardington Township - southwest
Canaan Township - northwest

Two villages are located in Gilead Township: Edison in the west, and Mount Gilead, the county seat of Morrow County in the center.

Name and history
Gilead Township was organized in 1835. It is the only Gilead Township statewide.

Government
The township is governed by a three-member board of trustees, who are elected in November of odd-numbered years to a four-year term beginning on the following January 1. Two are elected in the year after the presidential election and one is elected in the year before it. There is also an elected township fiscal officer, who serves a four-year term beginning on April 1 of the year after the election, which is held in November of the year before the presidential election. Vacancies in the fiscal officership or on the board of trustees are filled by the remaining trustees.

References

External links
County website

Townships in Morrow County, Ohio
1835 establishments in Ohio
Populated places established in 1835
Townships in Ohio